The eastcoast squeaker (Synodontis zanzibaricus) is a species of fish in the upside-down catfish family (Mochokidae). It is found in Kenya and Tanzania, and possibly in Somalia. Its natural habitat is rivers. This species grows to a length of  TL.

References

External links 

Synodontis
Freshwater fish of Kenya
Freshwater fish of Tanzania
Fish described in 1868
Taxa named by Wilhelm Peters
Taxonomy articles created by Polbot